Michael Zittel (born 9 February 1951) is a German stage, film, and television actor.

Biography
Michael Zittel was born in Mosbach, Germany. His father was a doctor and his mother was a homemaker. He studied medicine for a few semesters but then trained at a playhouse in Heidelberg. He is one of Germany's best known and most popular actors. From October 2006 to June 2009, he has played Johann Gruber in the ARD-telenovela "Sturm der Liebe" (Storm of Love). Since 2003, he has been living with his wife and three children in Munich where he also runs a furniture shop.

Filmography
His films include:-
2008: SOKO Kitzbühel
2008: Das Musikhotel am Wolfgangsee
2007: Tatort
2006-2009: Sturm der Liebe
2005: Der Clown
2001: Im Namen des Gesetzes
1998-2005: Siska
1995: Die einzige Zeugin
1994-2006: The Old Fox
1994: Die Wache

Theatre
 Das Geld liegt auf der Bank
 Laura
 Lissabonner Traviata
 Gerüchte?Gerüchte
 Lorbeeren für Herrn Schütz
 Schöne Familie
 Die Räuber
 Bericht für eine Akademie (Kafka)
 Merchant of Venice

References

1951 births
Living people
German male stage actors
German male television actors
German male film actors
Male actors from Heidelberg